Thevis Guruge (died 23 July 1989) was a distinguished broadcaster with Radio Ceylon and subsequently the Sri Lanka Broadcasting Corporation. He was the first Sinhala Announcer with Radio Ceylon - the oldest radio station in South Asia.

Iconic status
He enjoyed iconic status alongside other announcers of the station, Guruge was one of the early pioneers particularly where the Sinhala service was concerned. Millions tuned into Radio Ceylon. He was the second announcer in Radio Ceylon, who joined in 1949. He retired in 1983.

Chairman of ITN
In the 1980s Thevis Guruge was appointed Competent Authority of ITN in Sri Lanka after it was acquired by the government. Guruge was assassinated in 1989 by the JVP, whose youth squad had threatened him the week before.

Assassination
On July 5, 1989, he was appointed as the authority for the censorship of the news which was imposed under Guru's emergency. On July 23, 1989, Guruge was killed by the rebels when he was going to a shop in the morning on the bridge at Polhengoda Road in Narahenpita. He was shot with a T-56 assault rifle and five bullets were found in his body. The funeral took place on 25 July 1989 at Borella cemetery.

See also
Sri Lankan civil war

References

 Bayeux-Calvados Award for war correspondents: Tribute to journalists who have been murdered or who have died in the line of duty
Sri Lanka Broadcasting Corporation
 SLBC-creating new waves of history
Eighty Years of Broadcasting in Sri Lanka

External links
 Foxes watching over poultry
 ජාතියේ හද ගැස්ම සුසර කළ ජාතික ගුවන් විදුලිය

Sri Lankan radio personalities
Assassinated Sri Lankan journalists
Assassinated radio people
Year of birth missing
1989 deaths
People murdered in Sri Lanka
Unsolved murders in Sri Lanka